João Alberto Fraga Silva (born Estância, June 2, 1956) is a Brazilian retired colonel of the Military Police in Federal District the capital of Brazil and politician.

He has been a member of the Chamber of Deputies from 1999 until 2011 and since 2015, and is affiliated to the DEM.

References

External links
 

Democrats (Brazil) politicians
1956 births
Brazilian police officers
Living people